Impunity is a 2014 South African thriller film directed by Jyoti Mistry. It was screened in the Contemporary World Cinema section at the 2014 Toronto International Film Festival.

Cast
 Vaneshran Arumugam
 Francis Chouler as Michael Kelly
 Desmond Dube
 Alex McGregor
 Bjorn Steinbach

References

External links
 

2014 films
2014 thriller films
2010s English-language films
South African thriller films
English-language South African films
English-language thriller films